Lance Herbert Barnard AO (1 May 19196 August 1997) was an Australian politician and diplomat. He was the deputy leader of the Australian Labor Party (ALP) from 1967 to 1974 and held senior ministerial office in the Whitlam Government, most notably as Deputy Prime Minister of Australia from 1972 to 1974.

Barnard was born in Launceston, Tasmania, into a prominent political family; his father Claude Barnard was also a federal government minister. He was a timber worker, soldier and schoolteacher before entering politics himself. He was elected to the House of Representatives at the 1954 federal election, winning the seat of Bass that his father had lost five years earlier. Barnard was elected deputy to Gough Whitlam in 1967 and became deputy prime minister following the ALP's victory at the 1972 election.

After an initial "duumvirate" in which he and Whitlam both held multiple portfolios, Barnard was appointed Minister for Defence. He subsequently oversaw the merger of several smaller departments into the Department of Defence. In 1974, Barnard lost the deputy leadership to Jim Cairns but remained in the defence portfolio. He resigned from parliament in 1975 to become ambassador to Norway, Finland and Sweden, triggering a by-election that resulted in the loss of his seat to the Liberal Party.

Early life
Barnard was born in Launceston, Tasmania, one of four children born to Herbert Claude Barnard and the former Martha Melva McKenzie. His father, a trade unionist and locomotive driver, was elected to parliament in 1934, and was a minister in the Chifley Government.

Barnard left school during the Great Depression and worked in a timberyard for a few years. He began training as a schoolteacher by attending night school. In 1940, Barnard enlisted in the Australian Army. He fought with the 9th Division in the Middle East and Africa, including in the Battle of El Alamein. His military service left him with a permanent hearing impairment. After returning to Australia in 1945, Barnard qualified as a schoolteacher and subsequently taught mathematics in various Tasmanian schools.

Political career

At the 1954 federal election, Barnard was elected to the Division of Bass for the Labor Party. He defeated the sitting Liberal member Bruce Kekwick, who had defeated Claude Barnard for the seat in 1949. He was later elected to the ALP Federal Executive and a delegate to Federal Conference, where he "more than once put up spirited battles against left-wing influence".

Following the ALP's defeat at the 1966 federal election, Arthur Calwell resigned as party leader and was succeeded by his deputy Gough Whitlam. Barnard was then elected deputy leader with the endorsement of Whitlam, defeating Jim Cairns by 35 votes to 33 on the final ballot following the elimination of Frank Crean. At the time he was described in The Canberra Times as "a personal friend of Mr Whitlam and a competent if not brilliant speaker in the House, mainly on his father's subject of repatriation, and social services".

Whitlam Government

When the ALP won the 1972 federal election Barnard became deputy prime minister. For the first two weeks of Whitlam's government, before the full electoral result was known, Whitlam and Barnard formed a two-man ministry, known as a duumvirate, to govern until a full ministry could be announced. Barnard held 14 portfolios including Defence and Immigration. Following the announcement of a complete ministry, Barnard served as Minister for Defence.  He personally ensured the recommendations of the Jess Committee and new Defense Force Retirements Benefits Scheme was implemented in 1972.

Following the 1974 federal election, Barnard was challenged for Labor's deputy leadership by Jim Cairns. He was defeated by 54 votes to 42. Contemporary sources reporting that he was receiving "fairly active" support from Whitlam, and that Whitlam was "actively canvassing" for him. However, it was later reported that he had received "only token support" from the prime minister.

Later years
In June 1975, Whitlam announced that Barnard would leave politics to become Australia's resident ambassador to Sweden, with accreditation also to Finland and Norway. He presented his credentials to King Carl XVI Gustaf on 10 September. Bass was resoundingly lost to the Liberals at the ensuing by-election, in which Labor lost 17 per cent of its primary vote. This shock result was seen by many as the beginning of the end for the Whitlam government, which was dismissed five months later.

Barnard returned to Launceston after completing his term as ambassador in 1978. In May 1981 he was nominated by the Fraser Government as director of the Office of Australian War Graves. He retired in 1983.

Barnard died on 6 August 1997 at the age of 78. In response Gough Whitlam stated that "My partnership with Lance Barnard was the most satisfying and significant of my political life. I have lost my oldest and best mate".

Personal life
Barnard married Doris Burston on 6 March 1943. They had two daughters together, Patricia and Suzanne. He remarried on 11 September 1962 to Jill Cant, the daughter of Senator Harry Cant of Western Australia. They had a son together, Nicholas, and also adopted two Vietnamese orphan girls, Amanda and Jacqueline; Amanda died as an infant.

References

1919 births
1997 deaths
Deputy Prime Ministers of Australia
Australian Labor Party members of the Parliament of Australia
1975 Australian constitutional crisis
Members of the Australian House of Representatives for Bass
Members of the Australian House of Representatives
Members of the Cabinet of Australia
Officers of the Order of Australia
Ambassadors of Australia to Finland
Ambassadors of Australia to Norway
Ambassadors of Australia to Sweden
Politicians from Launceston, Tasmania
Defence ministers of Australia
20th-century Australian politicians
Government ministers of Australia
Australian Army personnel of World War II